The third rail of a nation's politics is a metaphor for any issue so controversial that it is "charged" and "untouchable" to the extent that any politician or public official who dares to broach the subject will invariably suffer politically. The metaphor comes from the high-voltage third rail in some electric railway systems.

Touching a third rail can result in electrocution, so usage of the metaphor in political situations relates to the risk of "political suicide" that a person would face by raising certain taboo subjects or having points of view that are either censored, shunned or considered highly controversial or offensive to advocate or even mention.

It is most commonly used in North America. Though commonly attributed to Tip O'Neill, Speaker of the United States House of Representatives from 1977 to 1987, it seems to have been coined by O'Neill aide Kirk O'Donnell in 1982 in reference to Social Security.

American examples of usage
A wide range of issues might be claimed detrimental to politicians tackling them, but those below have all been explicitly described using the "third rail" metaphor:

 Withdrawal of Social Security and Medicare benefits
 Debate of race issues
 Antidumping and countervailing duty withdrawal
 Opposition to abortion for rape victims
 Resuming the draft
 National content policy in export finance
 The role that gifted education plays in modern public school segregation
 Debate about the Israeli-Palestinian conflict and U.S. support for Israel
Debate about mass immigration and "White Replacement"
Diverting water from the Great Lakes to the Southwest
 Guns, including semi-automatic weapons and child safety locks.
California's Proposition 13 on property tax
The impact of meat consumption on climate change

Outside the U.S.

Argentina
The Falkland Islands sovereignty dispute

Australia
 Policies to address climate change

Canada
 Reforming or privatizing public health care 
 Reforming or privatizing the Canada Pension Plan
 Amending the Constitution of Canada

Denmark 
 Abolition of Store Bededag as a public holiday.

Germany 

 Introducing a speed limit on Autobahns

India
The introduction of income tax for agricultural income

United Kingdom
 Drug policy
 Reform of the National Health Service
 Social care
 West Lothian question
 Rejoining the European Union

China 
Questioning the political status of Taiwan
Advocating Hong Kong independence
Any of the issues affected by official censorship in China
Questioning internet censorship by the Great Firewall
Mention of or related events of the 1989 Tiananmen Square Massacre
Mention of the Uyghur genocide in Xinjiang internment camps
Mention of the Persecution of Falun Gong
Mention of the East Turkestan independence movement

Singapore
The term OB marker ("out of bounds marker", a golf term) is widely used in Singapore for forbidden topics, such as:
Homosexuality
Corruption
The Sedition Act makes it illegal to "promote feelings of ill-will or hostility between different races or classes of the population".

International politics
The political status of Crimea

See also

References

Political metaphors
1982 neologisms